Mudford  is a surname. Notable people with the surname include:

Clement Mudford (1915–1977), Australian sports shooter
Grant Mudford (born 1944), Australian photographer
Ken Mudford (1923–2004), motorcycle road racer from New Zealand
Phyllis Mudford King (1905–2006), English tennis player 
William Mudford (1782–1848), English writer and journalist
W. H. Mudford (1839–1916), English newspaper editor

Fictional characters:
 Colin Mudford, the main character in the novel Two Weeks with the Queen (1990)
 Luke Mudford, brother of the above